Paracomitas beui is an extinct species of sea snail, a marine gastropod mollusk in the family Pseudomelatomidae, the turrids and allies.

Distribution
This extinct marine species is endemic to New Zealand.

References

 Maxwell, P.A. (1988) Late Miocene deep-water Mollusca from the Stillwater Mudstone at Greymouth, Westland, New Zealand: paleoecology and systematics. New Zealand Geological Survey Paleontological Bulletin, 55, 1–120
 Maxwell, P.A. (2009). Cenozoic Mollusca. pp. 232–254 in Gordon, D.P. (ed.) New Zealand inventory of biodiversity. Volume one. Kingdom Animalia: Radiata, Lophotrochozoa, Deuterostomia. Canterbury University Press, Christchurch

beui
Gastropods described in 1988
Gastropods of New Zealand